The Battle of Khresili was fought in 1757, between the armies of the Kingdom of Imereti and the Ottoman Empire. The king of Imereti, Solomon I defeated the Turkish army. The battle took place on December 14, 1757. Solomon I established a strong monarchy and unified western Georgia. His actions strained the relations between the Georgian King and Ottoman Empire. The Ottomans, in particular, wanted to stop Solomon's struggle against slavery. The Ottomans were in an alliance with rebellious Georgian nobles, one such example was Levan Abashidze, who was fighting against the King of Imereti. Abashidze arrived in Akhaltsikhe and led an Ottoman army to the Kingdom of Imereti. Solomon enticed them into a strategically adroit place near Khresili and decisively defeated them.

Background
In the 17th century, western Georgia was a vassal of the Ottoman Empire. Ottoman garrisons were dispatched to Tsutskvati, Poti and Shorapani fortresses. 12,000 slaves were sold in the Ottoman Empire every year from Mengrelia alone. Realizing that Georgia was facing the threat of heavy depopulation, the King of Imereti, Solomon I prohibited slavery, opposing turncoat Lords and wanted independence from the Ottoman Empire. Sultan sent Gola Pasha with a large army to punish Solomon I and re-establish Ottoman rule over the Kingdom of Imereti.

Battle
Early in the morning, the Georgians started the attack. Ottoman army was cornered exactly where king Solomon I wanted them. Georgian attack was well prepared, numerically smaller Georgian army compensated its small size by high morale and determination to wipe out invading Turks from their land. King Solomon personally led his small army's charge, reached the commander of Turkish army and cut his head off. Turks panicked and tried to escape. But their leader, Abashidze somehow restored moral in Turkish army and they returned back to battle, but soon Abashidze was killed by Georgian soldier: Gegela Tevdoradze (later he was called Gegelashvili). after they saw the death of their commander, Selcuks finally gave up on fighting and Georgians decisively defeated the Ottoman army, and slaughtered most of 45,000 Turkish invasion force. 

Ottomans never recovered from such a massive loss of manpower. Two further attempts to invade Imereti after this battle were with smaller Ottoman armies of 20,000 and 13,000 people strong, and while they were still numerically superior to Solomon I's small army, they were defeated just as well. This marked the end of two centuries of Turkish influence in Western Georgia, during which kingdom of Imereti was a vassal of Ottoman Empire. 

Solomon I the Great and his kingdom achieved in mid 1700s a full independence from Ottomans, without support from other great powers or external alliances, which was unprecedented for other Eastern European nations who were either conquered or became vassals of Ottoman Empire earlier than Imereti kingdom and gained independence from Ottomans much later than Imereti kingdom.

Strategic ramifications
The importance of the battle of Khresili is often misunderstood and underestimated. The decisive Georgian victory ended Turkish influence in Western Georgia in mid 1700s, which started with battle of Sokhoista in mid 1500s at zenith of Ottoman power. While West Georgian (Imereti) kingdom still remained under Bagrationi dynasty even during the following two centuries of Turkish influence in Western Georgia since mid 1500s, it was the Ottoman vassal during these two centuries, similar to Walachia or Hungary at the time.

The battle of Khresili was a Georgian reconquista, which ended Turkish presence in Imereti. Imereti kingdom regained its full independence from Ottoman Empire after several subsequent repeat Turkish invasions, after the battle of Khresili, were defeated as well. Ottomans were eventually forced to sign a treaty with the kingdom of Imereti, which stated that Imereti was no longer an Ottoman vassal, and the only remnant of past Ottoman glory in this treaty was an annual tribute of 60 women (of any ethnic origin, not necessarily Georgians), which king Solomon failed to honor anyway.

The Ottomans wanted to destroy Solomon I and his supporters, and to finally conquer western Georgia.  The aim of the Georgians was to clear Imereti of Turks, which was successfully achieved.

References

Khresili
Khresili
1757 in the Ottoman Empire
18th century in Georgia (country)
Battles involving the Ottoman Empire